'

Michael Webster is a Canadian clinical psychologist and former Canadian Football League player for the Montreal Alouettes and BC Lions, and Grey Cup champion. He was also a successful professional wrestler.

Webster first learned football in Vancouver and used those skills to play at the famous University of Notre Dame. He returned home to play one season with the BC Lions, 16 games, before he was traded to the Montreal Alouettes. He played 4 seasons and 56 games with the Larks, winning the Grey Cup in 1970. He was also a player representative, and his activities got him traded to the Hamilton Tiger-Cats. Faced with a substantial cut in pay, he retired from football. He had also studied psychology at McGill University while in Montreal.

Being very big, and having met several football players that were wrestlers, professional wrestling became his next career. From 1971 to 1976 he became Iron Mike Webster on the wrestling circuit mainly in Vancouver and Pacific Northwest. During this period he completed his master's degree at Western Washington University. After leaving wrestling he completed his PhD in 1981 from Western Washington.

This led to his final career as a clinical psychologist, teaching at "the British Columbia Police Academy, the Canadian Police College, Europol, and the FBI Academy at Quantico, Virginia." He has specialized "in working with police crisis teams." This includes the Branch Davidian standoff in Waco, Texas in 1993, the 1995 standoff at Gustafsen Lake, B.C, and testifying at the Braidwood Inquiry.

Championships and accomplishments
Cauliflower Alley Club
Men's Wrestling Award (2012)

References

External links
1970 GREY CUP ENGRAVING
CFLAPEDIA BIO
FANBASE BIO
The evolution of Mike Webster: Football - Part 1
The evolution of Mike Webster: Football - Part 2
The evolution of Mike Webster: Football - Part 3

1944 births
BC Lions players
Canadian male professional wrestlers
Clinical psychologists
Notre Dame Fighting Irish football players
Living people
McGill University Faculty of Science alumni
Montreal Alouettes players
Players of Canadian football from British Columbia
Sportspeople from Victoria, British Columbia
Western Washington University alumni